Sárszentágota is a village in Fejér county, Hungary.

The village of Sárszentágota has about 1400 inhabitants. It is located in Fejér county, East of the Lake Balaton and West of the river Danube. 
The forest that is managed by the village council is home to various animals including foxes, deer and over 150 different types of birds.

External links 

 Street map 

Populated places in Fejér County